Center House is an unincorporated community in the town of Green Lake, Green Lake County, Wisconsin, United States.

References

Unincorporated communities in Green Lake County, Wisconsin
Unincorporated communities in Wisconsin